Nikolske, is an urban settlement (town) in Donetsk Oblast (province), located in the industrial region of the Donets Basin in Ukraine. It was the administrative seat of Nikolske Raion, the settlement belongs since the July 2020 Reform to Mariupol Raion. Population: 

The town's original name was Nikolske. After the Bolshevik revolution, it was changed to Volodarske after a renown communist writer. The town was captured by the Donetsk People's Republic during the 2022 Russian invasion of Ukraine, and the occupiers changed its name to Volodarske on May 4, 2022, signifying a "reuturn of the Soviet Union". The Ukrainian authorities continue to use Nikolske.

Gallery

References

External links
 Volodarske at the Ukrainian Soviet Encyclopedia

Urban-type settlements in Mariupol Raion